Oleksandr Myroslavovych Kobelyash (born 30 August 2000) is a Ukrainian professional footballer who plays as a centre-back for Ukrainian club Uzhhorod.

References

External links
 
 
 

2000 births
Living people
Sportspeople from Uzhhorod
Kharkiv State College of Physical Culture 1 alumni
Ukrainian footballers
Association football defenders
FC Oleksandriya players
FC Uzhhorod players
Ukrainian First League players